Demmin is a town in the Mecklenburgische Seenplatte district, Mecklenburg-Western Pomerania, Germany.  It was the capital of the former district of Demmin.

Geography 
Demmin lies on the West Pomeranian plain at the confluence of the rivers Peene, Tollense and Trebel. Lake Kummerow and the Bay of Stettin (Oderhaff) may be reached by boat on the Peene, Neubrandenburg via Altentreptow on by-roads and cycleways. The area of the confluences of the Tollense and Trebel with the Peene are called the Three Streams Land (Dreistromland) for tourist purposes and borrowing from the ancient land of Zweistromland.

North of Demmin is the Drosedow Forest and woods of Woldeforst (c. 174 ha.). Here is also the Kronwald Nature Reserv (103 ha.). To the west on the left bank of the Peene is the woodland area of Devener Holz and, on the left bank, Vorwerk Switzerland (Vorwerker Schweiz). To the east of the town are the Sandberg Pines and, to the southeast, the Vorwerk Forest.

Neighbouring towns and villages 
To the north of the borough are Nossendorf and Loitz, to the east, Kletzin, Siedenbrünzow and Utzedel, to the south, Beggerow, Borrentin and Schönfeld and to the west, Warrenzin.

Subdivisions 
The following villages also belong to Demmin: Deven, Drönnewitz, Erdmannshöhe, Karlshof, Lindenfelde, Randow, Seedorf (incorporated on 1 April 1942), Siebeneichen, Vorwerk, Waldberg, Woldeforst and Wotenick (incorporated on 1 June 2004).

Villages and populations

History

Name 
The name may originate from the Slavic term timänie 'swampy area'. Another possible origin for the name Demmin could be from Old Polabian dym (plural: dyminy) 'smoke', referring to clearing land through burning to make settlement possible. In 1075, Adam of Bremen  reported a fight over the castle at Dimine. In the course of history, the name changed, and sources refer to Dymine and Dimin, Latinized to Dyminium, finally Demmyn, and since 1320 the town has been known under its present spelling Demmin.

A popular explanation of the name, but without any historical basis, is as follows: two princesses built a castle called Haus Demmin and promised each other (in the Low German language spoken in Demmin) Dat Hus is din und min ('That house is thine [din] and mine [min]'). Thus the name of the castle and of the city is said to have developed.

Prehistory 
As early as 5500 - 4900 BC, the Neolithic Linear Pottery culture spread from the East, and from the Oder river into the area east of Demmin. The great dolmen near Upost is classified as the easternmost great dolmen. As an evidence of the Funnelbeaker culture, 119 Megalith constructions bear witness around the county of Demmin. Of these, 56 are partially preserved. The majority of these constructions are 37 Dolmen The fact that there are also six simple dolmen preserved, makes Demmin and its surrounding area one of those regions in which the construction of such facilities had its roots. The later period is characterized by 12 preserved in the district of Demmin Tumulus and basin stones. From about 1800 BC on, the settlement of the area by Germanic peoples began.

Saxon Wars to 10th century 

Slavic settlements of the Veleti in the forests surrounding Demmin can be traced back to the 8th century. In 789, during the Saxon wars, Charlemagne led his troops to the Peene river, against the Veleti who were allies of the Saxons. Dragovit, king of the Veleti, whose castle, civitas Dragowiti was said to most likely have been located at Vorwerk (Demmin), submitted to Charlemagne and swore fealty. The region was very suitable for a settlement and was important due to its location at the crossing of rivers and trade roads. During the struggle between the Veleti and the Franks, a border castle was erected by Lutici Circipanians at the dawn of the 10th century. That castle was later called "Haus Demmin". It controlled the Eastern parts of Circipania, a territory that stretched to Güstrow in the west. Its main castle was Teterow.

Middle Ages 
Demmin was a stronghold of the West Slav Circipanes during the Middle Ages. Due to its strategical importance, burghs were erected (and often attacked and destroyed) at the Vorwerk and Haus Demmin sites, named Dimin or Dymin. A Saxon army unsuccessfully besieged the settlement during the 1147 Wendish Crusade. Yet, the armed conflicts with their neighbors and invasion troops from Germany and Denmark devastated the Circipanes land badly. It was resettled by Germans and Flemmings by the 12th to 14th centuries. Circipania was split between Mecklenburg and Pommern, with Demmin on the Pomeranian side becoming a residence town for Pomeranian dukes (Teilherzogtum Pomerania-Demmin).

Modern Age 

Like most of Pomeranian areas aside the larger coastal Hanse cities, the character of Demmin and its surrounding areas remained rural and dominated by agriculture until today, even though Demmin had been a member of the Hanse league because of the rivers (e.g. the Peene River) connecting this area to the Baltic coast.

During the Thirty Years' War, Demmin was occupied by imperial forces from 1627 to 1630, and thereafter by Swedish forces.

In the Weimar Republic Demmin was a stronghold of the nationalistic organisations DNVP and the Stahlhelm. Even before 1933 there were boycotts of Jewish businesses, which drove away most of the Jews and the synagogue was sold in June 1938 to a furniture company, which is why it survives as a building today. In the last free national elections to the Reichstag on 5 March 1933 the National Socialist Party won 53.7 percent of votes in Demmin. On 11 November 1938, thousands gathered in the square in an anti-Semitic demonstration as part of Kristallnacht.

During World War II, Poles, Russians, as well as POWs from France and Belgium were used as forced labour in the town.

German troops destroyed the bridges over the Peene while retreating from Demmin during World War II. This way, the advance of the Soviet Red Army was slowed down when they arrived in Demmin on 30 April 1945. During  that night and the following morning, Demmin was handed over to the Red Army largely without fighting, similar to other cities like Greifswald. Rapes, pillage and executions committed by Red Army soldiers triggered a mass suicide of hundreds of people and nearly all of the Old Town was burned down by the Red Army.

Coat of arms 
The coat of arms of Demmin displays:
 a red fortress with three open gates
 the two towers are topped by a silver lily
 a leaned to the right silver shield displaying a
 red griffin is the heraldic animal of Pomerania
 On top of the shield there is a crowned, blue helmet with green peacock feathers
 The red fortress symbolizes the city's history as the residency of Pomeranian princes
 The lily crowning both towers symbolizes the city flower used in the 18th century.

Notable residents 
 Julius Friedrich Cohnheim (1839–1884), pathologist
 Joachim Lütkemann (1608–1655), preacher and author
 Heinrich Carl von Schimmelmann (1724–1782), merchant and politician

References

External links 

  
 Official website of the Demmin Historian Wolfgang Fuhrmann 
 Pomeranian Princes castle in Demmin (Haus Demmin) 

Members of the Hanseatic League
1230s establishments in the Holy Roman Empire
1236 establishments in Europe
Populated places established in the 13th century
Soviet World War II crimes